Dmitri Vladimir "Dima" Poliaroush (born September 20, 1970) is a Belarusian gymnastics coach and former competitive trampolinist. He is a six-time World Champion, seven-time European Champion, and twenty-time World Cup winner. He competed at the 2000 Summer Olympics and the 2004 Summer Olympics, finishing fifth and fourth respectively. He was the first man to perform a “Double Full In – Double Full Out” on trampoline and the skill is named after him. He is the only person who has been an active trampolinist and trampoline coach at the Olympic Games.

Early life 
Dmitri Poliaroush was born on September 20, 1970 in Berezniki, Russia. From a young age, he wanted to be an astronaut. At the age of 6, he saw a trampolinist flying in the air, and later told his mother that he wanted to do this. He joined the local trampoline club in Berezniki, where his talent was noticed. Starting from an early age, he worked out many hours per day.

Competitive career

Before 1990 
In 1984, Poliaroush won the Soviet Union Junior National Competitions and was named to the Soviet Union junior team. In 1985, he competed in his first international competition in Denmark, where he finished 5th. In 1986, he won the bronze medal at the Soviet Union National Championships, won the European Junior Championships, and participated at his first Trampoline World Championships in Paris. At the early age of 16, he had already finished 5th in the world.

In 1987 and 1988, Poliaroush won the Soviet Union National Championships, which had been one of his big goals. In 1988, he competed at the World Championships in Birmingham, USA, where he brought home a gold medal in the team competition and a silver in the individual competition. He finished second in the final round of competition to trampoline legend Vadim Krasnoshapka by only 0.2.

1990s
From 1990, Poliaroush regularly competed head to head against Alexander Moskalenko. At the 1990, World Championships in Essen, Germany, Poliaroush won two gold medals (team and synchronized), and silver again in individual, placing second to teammate Alexander Moskalenko. This loss was a motivation for Poliaroush to make upgrades to his routine.

In 1991 at the European Championships, Poliaroush competed with a routine that had a difficulty of 14.6, which was a new world record. His routine finished with a new skill that had never been seen before, it was a double full in – double full out, which would later be named the “Poliaroush”. In 1991, the Soviet Union Sports Government honored him with the highest national athletic title, Honor Master of Sport of the Soviet Union. In 1992, Poliaroush was not able to compete at the World Championships even though he had a new routine and was in the best shape of his life. This was a time of political problems within the Soviet Union.

In 1993, Poliaroush moved to Vitebsk, Belarus and started representing Belarus at international competitions. This helped the Belarus team tremendously. He led the team to beat the reigning world champions, Russia at the World Championships in 1994. In 1995, the Belarus Sport Administration awarded Poliaroush with the title Honored Master of Sport of the Republic of Belarus. In 1995 and 1996, he won many world cup titles, world cup final, European Championships, and finally the individual world title, at the World Championships in 1996 in Vancouver, Canada.

After this competition, Poliaroush retired from the sport but in 1998, when the sport was added to the Olympics, he decided to make a comeback. At the time, he was already living in the Lafayette, Louisiana, United States where he had started his coaching career. It was very difficult for him to combine his coaching and training life together. At the 1999 World Championships in South Africa, he finished in 4th place.

2000 – 2005
Motivated by his 1999 South African finish, Poliaroush and in 2000 he won all competitions that he entered, including the World Cup in Great Britain where he set two new world records, in Optional Routine and total score. His routine was given a 42.1, with a 14.2 tariff of difficulty, which made his execution scores, 9.3 9.2 9.3 9.4 9.3. In Sydney, Australia, trampoline made its Olympic debut. Two days before the competition took place, Poliaroush celebrated his 30th birthday. Preliminary competitions went extremely well, but he made a significant error in the final routine and finished in 5th place.

After a half year of break, Poliaroush decided to continue competing until the 2004 Olympic Games. He was a winner and medalist at many competitions such as the Goodwill Games, World Cups, and in 2003 at the World Championships, he won the synchronized world title with Nikolai Kasak, which made him the oldest male to win a world title in trampoline. He was 33 years old. In Athens, at the Olympic Games, Poliaroush finished 4th. He saw this a good way to end off his career at the age of 34. The 19 year international career was a major success, he had a total of 13 medals from the World Championships, which makes him the second most decorated male trampolinist in history (behind Alexander Moskalenko).

In 2005, there was a big retirement party for Poliaroush in Vitebsk, Belarus.

Trampoline records and special awards 
Poliaroush set many world records in the sport of trampoline. They are listed below:
 1991-1997- World Difficulty Record
 2000 –  Highest Optional Score
 2000 – Highest Total Score
 2004 – Winner of the most individual World Cups (Men)
There were also many prestigious awards that Poliaroush earned throughout, and even after his career was complete. Some of them are listed below:
 1991– Honor Master of Sport of the USSR
 1995 – Honor Master of Sport of the Republic of Belarus
 2008 – Inducted to Gallery of the Legends, World Acrobatic Association
 1991 – Invented the double full in – double full out, “Poliaroush”

Coaching career 
In 1998, Poliaroush began coaching at Trampoline and Tumbling Express in Lafayette, Louisiana USA. He has coached and produced numerous USA National Team Members, USA National Champions, World Age Group Games Winners, medalist at World Championships, Pan American Games Champion, 2008 Olympians (Erin Blanchard, Christ Estrada), and 2010 Youth Olympians (Savannah Vinsant, Hunter Brewster). From 2005–2008, Poliaroush was the USA Trampoline and Tumbling National Team Coordinator, where he was serving USA Gymnastics to help develop the Sport of Trampoline in the United States. USA Gymnastics awarded him with the USA Trampoline Coach of the Year Award in 2002, 2003, and 2008.

Poliaroush currently resides in Lafayette, Louisiana, where he is the president of the Olympic Trampoline Academy and the head trampoline coach at Trampoline and Tumbling Express. He is serving the Fédération Internationale de Gymnastique on the Trampoline Technical Committee as the Athlete Representative. He has judged all over the world with his FIG Category 1 Brevet rating. He participates in many competitions and clinics around the country, to help the trampoline program grow and prosper.

References

External links 
 Dmitri Poliaroush – from Olympic Trampoline Academy home page

Belarusian male trampolinists
Living people
Gymnasts at the 2000 Summer Olympics
Gymnasts at the 2004 Summer Olympics
Olympic gymnasts of Belarus
1970 births